Sandra Cariboni (born 17 November 1963) is a Swiss former competitive figure skater in ladies' singles. She is the 1983 Swiss national champion and finished 11th at the 1984 Winter Olympics.

Personal life 
Sandra Cariboni was born on 17 November 1963 in Zofingen, Switzerland. She is the daughter of a pair of architects, Dino and Rita Carboni, who also worked as a skating coach, and has a sister, Claudia. After she was diagnosed with Krupp syndrome as an infant, her family moved to Davos.

Cariboni studied to become a veterinarian before becoming a homeopath in Zürich. She and her partner, Hans Gerber, have a son, Zeno, born in 2009.

Career 
Cariboni became the Swiss national junior champion at the age of 13. In 1982, she competed at her first major international event, the World Championships in Copenhagen, and finished 16th.

She began the following season by placing seventh at the 1982 Skate America and 13th at the 1982 NHK Trophy before winning the Swiss senior national title. She finished 13th at the 1983 European Championships in Dortmund and tenth at the 1983 World Championships in Helsinki.

Cariboni's most successful season was 1983–84. She placed sixth at the 1984 European Championships in Budapest, eleventh at the 1984 Winter Olympics in Sarajevo, and tenth at the 1984 World Championships in Ottawa.

In 1985, Cariboni dropped to eleventh at the European Championships in Gothenburg and 17th at the World Championships in Tokyo. After a long pause due to a knee injury, she lacked the motivation to return to competitive skating and decided to retire. She was a member of the Internationale Schlittschuh-Club in Davos.

Cariboni worked for two years as a skating coach at the Suvretta House in St. Moritz.

Competitive highlights

References

Swiss female single skaters
1963 births
Olympic figure skaters of Switzerland
Figure skaters at the 1984 Winter Olympics
Living people
People from Zofingen
Sportspeople from Aargau